Æðey (aka "Aedey Island") is a small island in the Westfjords region of Iceland.

It is inhabited by a single family and is a private family farm focused on environmentally sound eider down farming. 

The lighthouse was built in 1944, (operating since 1949) near the southernmost point of the island. 

Æðey is important in the history of Iceland and especially of the Westfjords region.

References 

Islands of Iceland
Westfjords